Irewole is a Local Government Area in Osun State, Nigeria. Its headquarters are in the town of Ikire in the south of the area at.

It has an area of 271 km and a population of 143,599 at the 2006 census.

The postal code of the area is 221.

Education
 Islamic middle school
 Ayedaade Government High School - Ikire

References

Local Government Areas in Osun State